Moses Joseph Machali (born 9 August 1981) is a Tanzanian NCCR–Mageuzi politician and Member of Parliament for Kasulu Town constituency since 2010 to 2015.

In July 2015, he defected from the NCCR-Mageuzi party to the Alliance for Change and Transparency.

References

1981 births
Living people
NCCR–Mageuzi MPs
Tanzanian MPs 2010–2015
Kasulu Secondary School alumni
St. Augustine University of Tanzania alumni